East Kerrier Rural District was a local government division of Cornwall in England, UK, between 1894 and 1934. Established under the Local Government Act 1894, the rural district was abolished in 1934 to create Kerrier Rural District, as well as enlarging Falmouth Municipal Borough, Penryn Municipal Borough and Truro Rural District.

References

Districts of England created by the Local Government Act 1894
1934 disestablishments in England
Rural districts of England
Local government in Cornwall
History of Cornwall